Stephanie Mouwandji Itsopault is a Gabonese politician. She is the current National Secretary of Social Affairs and Housing under the ruling Gabonese Democratic Party (Parti démocratique gabonais) (PDG).

References

Gabonese Democratic Party politicians
Living people
Year of birth missing (living people)
Government ministers of Gabon
21st-century women politicians
Women government ministers of Gabon
21st-century Gabonese politicians